Roger Allen may refer to:

Roger Allen (diplomat) (1909–1972), British ambassador to Greece, Iraq and Turkey
Roger Allen (translator) (born 1942), American Arabist and translator
Roger Allen (cross-country skier) (born 1952), Canadian former cross-country skier
Roger Allen (politician) (born 1952), former territorial level politician from Northwest Territories, Canada
Roger MacBride Allen (born 1957), American science fiction author
Roger Allen III (born 1986), American football player
Roger Allen (musicologist), musicologist and dean of St Peter's College, Oxford

See also

Allen (surname)